The Medal of Military Duty is a three-degree military order in Egypt.

History 
It is a military medal established on July 9, 1953. It is awarded to military personnel with distinguished services outside of the battlefield. A three-degree military medal, awarded for personal acts of extraordinary gallantry and intrepidity in direct. The Medal also is awarded to foreigners.

Recipients 
 Ibrahim Al-Rifai
 Ibrahim El-Orabi
 Salah Zulfikar
 Ahmad Shafik
 Reda Hafez
 Hosni Mubarak
 Omar Suleiman
 Mohamed Hussein Tantawi
 Mohab Mamish
 Murad Muwafi
 Mahmoud Hegazy
 Salah Halabi
 Abdel Fattah El-Sisi
 Sedki Sobhy
 Ahmed Muhammad Ali
 Hatem Saber
 Hossam Khairallah
 Ahmed Ragai Attia
 Muhammad Ali Bilal
 Mamdouh Qutb
 Ahmed Mukhtar (governor)
 Kamal Mansour
 Abd al-Hamid al-Sibai
 Abdel Moneim Ahmed Ghallush
 Ali Hefzy
 Youssef Sabry Abu Talib
 Magdy Hatata
 Osama El-Gendi
 Muhammad Samir Abdel Aziz
 Abu al-Majd Haroun
 Abdel Fattah Harhour
 Muhammad Abdullah
 Salah El-Manawy
 Mohammed Aly Fahmy
 Magdy Fouad Hegazy
 Muhammad Raafat Al-Dash
 Mohamed Zaki

References 

Orders, decorations, and medals of Egypt
Awards established in 1953